Ismaël Fanton Koné (born 12 July 1988) is a French former footballer who played as a defender.

Playing career
Koné developed in the youth system of French club RC Strasbourg.

He began his senior career in Greece, playing with Agrotikos Asteras F.C., Panserraikos F.C., and Iraklis Psachna F.C. Afterwards, he played for Hungarian club Egri FC, where he made 10 league appearances and one league cup appearance where he was substituted due to injury. In June 2013, he went on trial with Polish club Widzew Łódź. Afterwards, he played for Belgian club UR Namur.

References

1988 births
Living people
Footballers from Paris
Association football defenders
Panserraikos F.C. players
Egri FC players
Iraklis Psachna F.C. players
Nemzeti Bajnokság I players
French expatriate footballers
Expatriate footballers in Greece
Expatriate footballers in Hungary
French expatriate sportspeople in Greece
French expatriate sportspeople in Hungary
French footballers